The 2017 TEB Kültürpark Cup was a professional tennis tournament played on outdoor hard courts. It was the first edition of the tournament and was part of the 2017 ITF Women's Circuit. It took place in İzmir, Turkey, on 19–25 June 2017.

Singles main draw entrants

Seeds 

 1 Rankings as of 12 June 2017.

Other entrants 
The following player received a wildcard into the singles main draw:
  Berfu Cengiz
  Azradeniz Çömlek
  Betina Tokaç
  İlay Yörük

The following player received entry into the singles main draw using a protected ranking:
  Mihaela Buzărnescu

The following players received entry from the qualifying draw:
  Cemre Anıl
  İpek Öz
  Christina Shakovets
  Aymet Uzcátegui

Champions

Singles

 Mihaela Buzărnescu def.  Eri Hozumi, 6–1, 6–0

Doubles
 
 An-Sophie Mestach /  Nina Stojanović def.  Emma Laine /  Kotomi Takahata, 6–4, 7–5

External links 
 2017 TEB Kültürpark Cup at ITFtennis.com
 Official website

2017 ITF Women's Circuit
2017 in Turkish tennis
Tennis tournaments in Turkey